Annabel "Annie"  Holland (born 26 August 1965) is a British musician. She is best known as the bass guitarist and co-founder of the Britpop band Elastica.

Holland had an Elastica song titled in her honour. "Annie" was written by guitarist Donna Matthews and her friend Jane Oliver and is about going down to Brighton to visit Holland, which is where she spent most of the time when the band were not working.

Holland left the band after the Féile Festival on 6 August 1995. Although she had some well-publicised arguments with Matthews about the future of Elastica, Holland left because she was fed up with the constant touring and was suffering quite badly from repetitive strain injury. At the time Elastica had been on the road for almost a year, and with even more dates being added to their schedule, Holland decided enough was enough.

Holland re-joined Elastica in 1999 and remained a member until the band's demise in 2001.

On 21 January 2017 three-quarters of the original line-up of Elastica – Matthews, Annie Holland and Justin Welch – worked together on the remastering of Elastica.

References

1965 births
Living people
People from Brighton
English bass guitarists
Elastica members
Britpop musicians
Women bass guitarists